Wojda or Woyda is a gender-neutral Polish surname.  Notable people with this surname include:
Edward Wojda (1941–1990), Polish wrestler 
Karol Fryderyk Woyda (1771–1845), President of Warsaw, Poland
Kazimierz Woyda (1812–1877), President of Warsaw, son of Karol
Tadeusz Wojda (born 1957), Polish archbishop
Witold Woyda (1939–2008), Polish fencer
Wojciech Wojda (born 1966), Polish singer

Polish-language surnames